Three ships of the British Royal Navy have been named HMS Earnest:

  was a 12-gun gun-brig launched at Lieth in 1805 and sold in 1816. She then became the merchantman Earnest and continued to sail until 1850.
  was a wood screw gunboat launched in 1856 and sold in 1895.
  was a destroyer launched in 1896 and sold in 1920

Royal Navy ship names